Potato virus S (PVS) is a plant pathogenic virus. It was first reported in Netherlands.

PVS causes mild or no symptoms in most potato varieties. It is common in potatoes in many regions and does not cause significant yield losses. Field-grown potatoes are not routinely screened for this virus because it is not considered economically important.

See also 

 Viral diseases of potato

External links
ICTVdB - The Universal Virus Database: Potato virus S
Family Groups - The Baltimore Method

Carlaviruses
Viral plant pathogens and diseases